Jake Siegel (born February 22, 1989) is an American actor best known for playing the role of Mike "Cooze" Coozemen in both American Pie Presents: The Naked Mile (2007) and American Pie Presents: Beta House (2009). His television credits include guest roles in Commander in Chief, the Trojan Vision series Friends Hate You, and iCarly.

Filmography
Stranded (2003) (Jim)
The Need (2006) (Jake)
Commander in Chief (2006) (Kid 2) (Wind Beneath My Wing)
American Pie Presents: The Naked Mile (2006) (Cooze)
American Pie Presents: Beta House (2007) (Cooze)
iCarly (2009) (Cal) (iGo Nuclear)
Nice Knowing You (2009) (Scotty)
Hello (2010) (Ed)
Cavemen (2013) (Perry)
The Max Decker Sausage Company (2016) (Clitorus)

References

External links

1989 births
Living people
American male film actors